Parliamentary elections were held in Norway in 1841. As political parties were not officially established until 1884, all those elected were independents. The number of seats in the Storting was increased from 99 to 100. Voter turnout was 51%, although only 5.5% of the country's population was eligible to vote.

Results

References

General elections in Norway
19th-century elections in Norway
Norway
Parliamentary